Cho Kyoung-tae (Korean: 조경태, born 10 January 1968) is a South Korean politician.

Education 
Cho graduated from Pusan National University with Ph.D. in civil engineering.

Career 
Cho has been elected to the National Assembly four consecutive times in Busan, three times as democratic candidate and one time as Saenuri Party candidate.

In August 2018, Cho spoke about Refugees on Jeju Island, that counterfeit refugees should be deported back to Yemen.

On 11 May 2021, Cho announced he will run for the upcoming leadership election.

References 

1968 births
Living people
Members of the National Assembly (South Korea)
Liberty Korea Party politicians
Pusan National University alumni
People from Busan